Osaka Prefecture is the third-most populated of Japan's 47 prefectures. Both rising , the Osaka Prefectural Government Sakishima Building and the Rinku Gate Tower Building, which were completed in 1995 and 1996 respectively, are the second-tallest buildings in the prefecture. Overall, of the 25 tallest buildings in Japan, 4 are in Osaka Prefecture.

Osaka has been the site of many skyscraper construction projects in recent years. Since 2010, 12 buildings rising higher than  have been completed. As of June 2015, three such buildings are under construction in the prefecture. Several other construction projects planned to exceed the height of 150 metres are proposed for the near future.

Tallest buildings
This includes spires and architectural details but does not include antenna masts.

Under construction
This lists buildings that are under construction in Osaka and are planned to rise at least 150 metres (492 ft). Any buildings that have been topped out but are not completed are also included.

Timeline of tallest buildings

This is a list of buildings that once held the title of tallest building in Osaka.

Tallest structures
This list ranks Osaka structures that stand at least 150 meters (492 feet) tall, based on standard height measurement. This height includes spires, architectural details and antenna masts.

Demolished or destroyed structures

See also
List of tallest structures in Japan

Notes
A. This structure is not a habitable building but is included in this list for comparative purposes. Per a ruling by the Council on Tall Buildings and Urban Habitat, freestanding observation towers, chimneys or masts are not considered to be buildings, as they are not fully habitable structures.

References
General
 Osaka, Emporis.com
 Diagram of Osaka skyscrapers, SkyscraperPage.com

Specific

Osaka
 
Osaka